Somyot Prueksakasemsuk is Thai activist and magazine editor who in 2013 was sentenced to eleven years' imprisonment for lese majeste against King Bhumibol Adulyadej. His sentence drew protest from the European Union and from numerous human rights groups, including Amnesty International, which designated him a prisoner of conscience. He was an editor of the “Voice of Thaksin” (Voice of the Oppressed) magazine and a prominent labour rights activist affiliated with the Democratic Alliance of Trade Unions who protested for Thai labour law reform.

First lese majeste incident 

Somyot is a member of the "red shirts", a movement supporting former prime minister Thaksin Shinawatra; Thaksin was removed from power in 2006 by a coup d'état. In 2010, Somyot, then the editor of the magazine Voice of Thaksin, published two articles critical of a fictional character interpreted by the court as representing King Bhumibol Adulyadej. He was not the author of the two articles. Somyot was arrested for lese majesty on April 30, 2011, five days after launching a grass-roots campaign to collect 10,000 signatures for petition that called for a reform of the lese majesty law.

Somyot was arrested and imprisoned without bail for nearly two years. On 23 January 2013, the Criminal Court of Thailand convicted him of lese majeste and sentenced to a total of eleven years in prison: one year for a suspended sentence for a defamation charge, and five years each for the two counts of violating Article 112, the lese majeste law. The judge stated, "The accused is a journalist who had a duty to check the facts in these articles before publishing them. He knew the content defamed the monarchy but allowed their publication anyway". Somyot's lawyer said following the verdict that Somyot would appeal, adding: "I can confirm that he did not intend to violate Article 112 ... He was doing his job as a journalist."

The presiding judge in Somyot's case was Judge Chanathip Mueanphawong (ชนาธิป เหมือนพะวงศ์). Judge Chanathip has also been in charge of many lèse majesté cases, including the case of Ampon Tangnoppakul or Uncle SMS in which the judge sentenced Ampon to 20 years in prison, the case of Surachai Danwattananusorn who was sentenced to imprisonment for five years and six months, and the case of Chiranuch Premchaiporn who was given a suspended sentence of one-year imprisonment on grounds of failing to remove lèse majesté comments on her website.

International reaction 
The verdict came at a time when Thailand's lese majeste laws were becoming increasingly controversial domestically and internationally. Thai activists and human rights groups stated that the laws were disproportionately used to imprison "red shirts" and other political opponents of the government. Prior to the trial, an alliance of human rights organizations lobbied for the dismissal of the charges against Somyot, including Amnesty International, Freedom House, the International Federation for Human Rights (FIDH), and the World Organisation Against Torture (OMCT). Amnesty International called Somyot a "human rights defender" and designated him a prisoner of conscience, imprisoned "simply for peacefully exercising his right to freedom of expression". The Asian Human Rights Commission argued that the lese majeste law itself was unconstitutional in Thailand, protesting a Constitutional Court decision to uphold it.

A delegation of the European Union criticized the verdict in Somyot's case, stating that it "seriously undermines the right to freedom of expression and press freedom". Human Rights Watch stated that "The courts seem to have adopted the role of chief protector of the monarchy at the expense of free expression rights". Reporters Without Borders called the verdict an "affront to media freedom".

The court's chief judge, Thawee Prachuablarb, defended the sentence: "There have been criticisms, rather one-sided, that the court was too harsh in its judgement but the five-year prison term for each of the two counts is considered appropriate ... It is mid-way between the minimum sentence under this law, which is three years, and the maximum punishment of 15 years. The court made its ruling in accordance with the law."

His release from prison 

Somyot Prueksakasemsuk finished his sentence and was released from prison on April 30, 2018. In interviews, he said that he had lost his family and his job as a result of the lese majesty charge, and that at one point in jail, after developing gout due to wounds from his shackles, he had attempted suicide. Immediately upon his release he vowed to go back to fighting for democracy. “Participating in political activities is a civic duty. It is an expression. . . . So, I will join with any movement that demands elections. That’s surely a good thing."

Demanding Justice for Disappeared and Assassinated Political Dissidents 
Somyot played a leading role in demanding justice for a series of disappeared and assassinated lese majesty refugees who had been living in countries neighboring Thailand. After Surachai Danwattananusorn (aka Surachai Saedan), Chatchan Boophawan, and Kraidet Leulert disappeared on December 13, 2018, and the mutilated bodies of two of the men were subsequently found, Somyot with Surachai's widow Paranee Danwattananusorn sent a letter to Thailand's National Human Rights Commission, dated March 5, 2019, “Calling for Investigation into the Enforced Disappearance of Surachai Danwattananusorn and the Group Assassinated.”  Later three more Thai refugees with a similar background disappeared May 8, 2019, reportedly after being captured in Vietnam traveling with fake passports. Somyot helped Kanya Teerawut, mother of one of the disappeared, Siam Teerawut, to campaign (unsuccessfully) for his return. When Thai political refugee Wanchalearm Satsaksit was kidnapped in front of many witnesses in Phom Phen Cambodia, Somyot was once again at the forefront of the campaign demanding an investigation and justice for the disappeared dissident.

Further Arrests for Sedition and Lese Majesty 

Somyot was arrested again on October 16, 2020, under Article 116 of the Thai Criminal Code, a sedition charge, related to a speech given at a political rally on September 19, 2020. He was released on November 3, 2020.

Somyot was arrested again on February 9, 2021, also for the speech on September 19, 2020, this time for lese majesty. He is currently bail on April 23, 2021.

Awards 
In 2016, Somyot Prueksakasemsuk won the 24th Jeon Tae Il special Labour Award by the Jeon Tae Il Foundation.

References 

Prueksakasemsuk Somyot
Amnesty International prisoners of conscience held by Thailand
Lèse majesté in Thailand
Living people
Thai democracy activists
Thai human rights activists
Thai journalists
Thai monarchy reform activists
Thai political prisoners
Thai revolutionaries
People accused of lèse majesté in Thailand
People accused of lèse majesté in Thailand since 2020
Prueksakasemsuk Somyot
Prueksakasemsuk Somyot
People convicted of political crimes
People convicted of speech crimes